Johanne Harrelle (January 29, 1930 – August 4, 1994) was a Canadian actress, model, and writer, and the first black woman to rise to prominence in Quebec and Canada's fashion world.

She is perhaps most famous for her autobiographical role in Claude Jutra's first feature, À tout prendre (1964). Ms. Harrelle, who was romantically involved with Jutra for a time, played the lover and companion to the film's other protagonist, Claude, who was played by Jutra himself. Her role in the film, as herself, is very telling as it describes the way in which she was perceived as an exotic outsider in French Canada, and people often assumed that she was Haitian, despite having been born in Montreal. These assumptions are played with in the film, as when she performs a song in patois, "Ti-zoizeau".

Johanne was baptized Joan Harrell. She was raised with her two brothers in an orphanage after their African American father died and French Canadian mother fell ill when she was only 3 years old. She later became known in the fashion world as Johanne Harrelle. Her first appearance on a fashion runway was at Montreal's upscale Ritz Carlton Hotel in the 1950s, when black models were unheard of in Canada.

Harrelle, who was married twice, lived for 15 years with her second husband, the renowned Parisian sociologist Edgar Morin. She had two sons, Val Harrelle and Alain Cadieux.

She died from cancer on August 4, 1994.

References

1930 births
1994 deaths
Actresses from Montreal
Black Canadian actresses
Canadian film actresses
Canadian people of African-American descent
Female models from Quebec
Models from Montreal
20th-century Canadian actresses
20th-century Haitian people